The Mughal dynasty (Dudmân-e Mughal) comprised the members of the imperial House of Babur

The Mughals originated as a Central Asian branch of the Timurid dynasty, supplemented with extra Borjigin (the clan which ruled the Mongol Empire and its successor states) bloodlines. The dynasty's founder, Babur (born 1483), was a direct descendant of the Asian conqueror Timur (1336–1405) on his father's side and of Mongol emperor Genghis Khan (died 1227) on his mother's side, and Babur's ancestors had other affiliations with Genghisids through marriage and common ancestry. The term "Mughal" is itself a derivative form of "Mongol" in the Arabic and Persian languages: it emphasised the Mongol origins of the Mughal dynasty.

During much of the Empire's history, the emperor functioned as the absolute head of state, head of government and head of the military, while during its declining era much of the power shifted to the office of the Grand Vizier and the empire became divided into many regional kingdoms and princely states. However, even in the declining era, the Mughal Emperor continued to be the highest manifestation of sovereignty on the Indian subcontinent. Not only the Muslim gentry, but the Maratha, Rajput, and Sikh leaders took part in ceremonial acknowledgements of the Emperor as the sovereign of South Asia. The British East India Company deposed the imperial family and abolished the empire on 21 September 1857 during the Indian Rebellion of 1857. The London government declared the establishment of the Direct British governance the following year.

The British tried and convicted the last emperor, Bahadur Shah II, and exiled him (1858) to Rangoon in British-controlled Burma (present-day Myanmar).

History
The Mughal empire is conventionally said to have been founded in 1526 by Babur, a Timurid prince from Ferghana which today is in Uzbekistan. After losing his ancestral domains in Central Asia, Babur first established himself in Kabul and ultimately moved towards the Indian subcontinent. Mughal rule was interrupted for 16 years by the Sur Emperors during Humayun's reign. The Mughal imperial structure was founded by Akbar the Great around the 1580s which lasted until the 1740s, until shortly after the Battle of Karnal. During the reigns of Shah Jahan and Aurangzeb, the dynasty reached its zenith in terms of geographical extent, economy, military and cultural influence.

Around 1700, the dynasty was ruling the wealthiest empire in the world, with also the largest military on earth. Mughals had approximately 24 percent share of world's economy and a military of one million soldiers. At that time the Mughals ruled almost the whole of the South Asia with 160 million subjects, 23 percent of world's population. The Dynasty's power rapidly dwindled during 18th century with internal dynastic conflicts, incompatible monarchs, foreign invasions from Persians and Afghans, as well as revolts from Marathas, Sikh, Rajputs and regional Nawabs. The power of the last emperor was limited only to the Walled city of Delhi.

Many of the Mughals had significant Indian Rajput and Persian ancestry through marriage alliances as they were born to Rajput and Persian princesses. Mughals played a great role in the flourishing of Ganga-Jamuni tehzeeb (Indo-Islamic civilization). Mughals were also great patrons of art, culture, literature and architecture. Mughal painting, architecture, culture, clothing, cuisine and Urdu language; all were flourished during Mughal era. Mughals were not only guardians of art and culture but they also took interest in these fields personally. Emperor Babur, Aurangzeb and Shah Alam II were great calligraphers, Jahangir was a great painter, Shah Jahan was a great architect while Bahadur Shah II was a great poet of Urdu.

Succession to the Throne

The Mughal dynasty operated under several basic premises: that the Emperor governed the empire's entire territory with complete sovereignty, that only one person at a time could be the Emperor, and that every male member of the dynasty was hypothetically eligible to become Emperor, even though an heir-apparent was appointed several times in dynastic history. The certain processes through which imperial princes rose to the Peacock Throne, however, were very specific to the Mughal Empire. To go into greater detail about these processes, the history of succession between Emperors can be divided into two eras: Era of Imperial successions (1526–1713) and Era of Regent successions (1713–1857).

Disputed Headship of Dynasty (Incomplete) 
The Mughal Emperors practiced polygamy. Besides their wives, they also had several concubines in their harem, who produced children. This makes it difficult to identify all the offspring of each emperor.

A man in India named Habeebuddin Tucy claims to be a descendant of Bahadur Shah II, but his claim is not universally believed.

Another woman named Sultana Begum who lives in the slums of Kolkata has claimed that her late husband, Mirza Mohammad Bedar Bakht was the great-grandson of Bahadur Shah II.

Ziauddin Tucy is a sixth generation descendant of the last Mughal Emperor Bahadur Shah Zafar and today struggles to make ends meet. Living in a rented house, he still believes that the government will release properties of the erstwhile Mughals to the legal heirs. He also demands restoration of a Rs. 100 scholarship for Mughal descendants, that was discontinued by the government a while back. He wants that amount be raised to Rs 8,000. and that the government should grant the economically depressed Mughal descendants the money for their upliftment. Tucy has two unemployed sons and is currently living on pension.

A man named Mirza Muhammad Khair ud-din Mirza, Khurshid Jah Bahadur was recognised as head of the Timurid dynasty, in 1931 by the Government of India. He emigrated to Lahore in Pakistan following the partition of India in 1947. He died in 1975, and it was assumed that his son Mirza Ghulam Moinuddin Muhammad Javaid Jah Bahadur would become the head of the dynasty.

References

Further reading
 

 
 
Mughal emperors
Mughal nobility
Maturidis